Pfaffia jubata is a plant native to Cerrado vegetation in Brazil.

References

Amaranthaceae
Flora of Brazil
Flora of the Cerrado
Taxa named by Carl Friedrich Philipp von Martius